Roettiers is a surname. Notable people with the surname include,

 Charles Norbert Roettiers (1729–1772), French engraver and medallist
 Francois Roettiers (1685–1742), London-born Flemish Baroque artist
 Jacques Roettiers (1707–1784), French engraver and medallist
 Jacques-Nicolas Roettiers (1736-1788), French silversmith
 John Roettiers (1631–1703), English engraver and medallist
 Joseph-Charles Roettiers (1691–1779), French engraver and medallist
 Joseph Roettiers (1635–1703), Flemish medallist
 Norbert Roettiers (1665–1727), Flanders-born engraver and medallist